USS Commodore McDonough was a ferryboat acquired by the Union Navy during the American Civil War. Ferryboats were of great value, since – because of their flat bottom and shallow draft — they could navigate streams and shallow waters that other ships could not.

Purchased in New York City in 1862
Commodore McDonough — an armed, side-wheel ferry — was purchased on 5 August 1862 in New York City; fitted out at New York Navy Yard; and commissioned on 24 November 1862, Lieutenant Commander G. Bacon in command.

Civil War service

Assigned to the South Atlantic Blockade
Commodore McDonough joined the South Atlantic Blockading Squadron at Port Royal, South Carolina on 11 December 1862. Throughout her service, she operated in South Carolina waters, primarily off Charleston, but often cruising up the many rivers of that coast to bombard shore installations, cover the landing of troops, engage Confederate batteries, and perform reconnaissance. In the continuing operations in Charleston Harbor, she frequently bombarded the forts protecting the city.

Foundered while under tow at war’s end
At the close of the war, she assisted in harbor clearance at Port Royal, South Carolina, and on 23 August 1865 — while under tow for New York — she foundered.

References

External links
 

Ships of the Union Navy
Steamships of the United States Navy
Gunboats of the United States Navy
American Civil War patrol vessels of the United States
Maritime incidents in August 1865
Shipwrecks in the Atlantic Ocean